Mihai Țurcan (born 20 August 1989) is a Moldovan football forward who last played for JK Sillamäe Kalev.

Club statistics
Total matches played in Moldovan First League: 75 matches - 14 goal

References

External links

1989 births
Living people
Association football forwards
Moldovan footballers
Sportspeople from Bălți
FC Milsami Orhei players
FC Zimbru Chișinău players
CSF Bălți players
FC Tiraspol players
FC Veris Chișinău players
FC Academia Chișinău players
FC Kaisar players
JK Sillamäe Kalev players
Moldovan Super Liga players
Meistriliiga players
Moldovan expatriate footballers
Expatriate footballers in Estonia
Moldovan expatriate sportspeople in Estonia